Proteuxoa hypochalchis is a moth of the family Noctuidae. It is found in New South Wales and Queensland.

The larvae feed on Lobularia maritima.

Adults are preyed on by the spider species Dichrostichus magnificus, which emits a pheromone similar to that of the female moth to attract male moths within range of a sticky ball of glue which the spider swings on a length of silk.

External links
Australian Faunal Directory
Australian Insects

Proteuxoa
Moths of Australia
Moths described in 1902
Taxa named by Oswald Bertram Lower